The 72nd Street station was a local station on the demolished IRT Second Avenue Line in Manhattan, New York City. It had three tracks and two side platforms. The next stop to the north was 80th Street. The next stop to the south was 65th Street. The station closed on June 11, 1940.  The site is now served by the 72nd Street station of the Second Avenue Subway.

References

External links
 

IRT Second Avenue Line stations
Railway stations closed in 1940
Former elevated and subway stations in Manhattan
1940 disestablishments in New York (state)